St Athan is the name of the electoral ward, coterminous with the community of St Athan, Vale of Glamorgan, Wales. It elects one county councillor to the Vale of Glamorgan Council.

According to the 2011 census the population of the ward was 4,495.

The current county councillor, Cllr John Thomas, has been the incumbent since the 1999 election when he beat the sitting Labour councillor by only 17 votes. He became leader of the Council in May 2017.

Council elections

2017

2012

2008

2004

1999

1995

Cllr Doughty was previously the county councillor for the ward of St Athan With Boverton on South Glamorgan County Council.

References

St Athan
Vale of Glamorgan electoral wards